Streptomyces violaceolatus is a bacterium species from the genus of Streptomyces.

Further reading

See also 
 List of Streptomyces species

References

External links
Type strain of Streptomyces violaceolatus at BacDive -  the Bacterial Diversity Metadatabase

violaceolatus
Bacteria described in 1970